The National Football Foundation Distinguished American Award is among the highest offered by the National Football Foundation (NFF). Every year, the NFF & College Football Hall of Fame pays tribute to a select few with awards of excellence for exhibiting superior qualities of scholarship, citizenship and leadership. Additionally, the Foundation also recognizes individuals who demonstrate outstanding support for the NFF and its mission of promoting the game of amateur football. The Distinguished American Award is presented on special occasions when a truly deserving individual emerges, the award honors someone who has applied the character building attributes learned from amateur sport in their business and personal life, exhibiting superior leadership qualities in education, amateur athletics, business and in the community.

The recipient is not limited to a former college player or coach, must be an outstanding person who has maintained a lifetime of interest in the game and who, over a long period of time, has exhibited enviable leadership qualities and made a significant contribution to the betterment of amateur football in the United States.

Selection process

Various individuals associated with The National Football Foundation, such as former recipients, board members corporate leaders, chapter presidents and friends send nominations and suggestions to the NFF Chairman. Selection of the recipient is made by the Awards Committee and ratified by the Board of Directors.

Recipients

1966 - Bill Carpenter 
1969 - Archibald MacLeish 
1970 - Vince Lombardi 
1971 - Frank Boyden 
1972 - Jerome H. Holland 
1973 - (no award) 
1974 - Bob Hope 
1975 - Theodore Hesburgh 
1976 - James Van Fleet 
1977 - Rev. Edmund P. Joyce 
1978 - (no award) 
1979 - John W. Galbreath 
1980 - Fred Russell 
1981 - Sonny Werblin 
1982 - Silver Anniversary (all honored) Jim Brown, Willie Davis, Jack Kemp, Ron Kramer, Jim Swink
1983 - Leon Hess & James Stewart 
1984 - David M. Nelson 
1985 - William J. Flynn 
1986 - John Toner 
1987 - Ike Sewell 
1988 - Joe M. Rodgers 
1989 - Moose Krause 
1990 - Pete Rozelle 
1991 - Joe Paterno 
1992 - Wellington Mara 

1993 - Dick Kazmaier 
1994 - Charles F. Bolden, Jr. 
1995 - Tom Osborne 
1996 - J. Donald Monan, S.J 
1997 - (no award) 
1998 - Roy Kramer 
1999 - (no award) 
2000 - Arthur J. Decio  
2001 - Dr. James Frank 
2002 - George B. Young 
2003 - Robert Khayat 
2004 - Robert Casciola 
2005 - Alan Page
2006 - Pat Tillman
2007 - Rocky Bleier 
2008 - T. Boone Pickens
2009 - Billy Payne
2010 - Tom Brokaw
2011 - Archie Roberts
2012 - George Bodenheimer
2013 -  Gen. Ray Odierno
2014 - (no award) 
2015 - Rear Adm. Bill Byrne, USN
(2015) - Capt. Jared Tew, USAF
(2015) - Maj. Graham White, USA
2016 -  Adm. William McRaven

See also
Walter Camp Man of the Year
Walter Camp Distinguished American Award
Walter Camp Alumni of the Year
Amos Alonzo Stagg Award
National Football Foundation Distinguished American Award
National Football Foundation Gold Medal Winners
Theodore Roosevelt Award (NCAA)
Walter Payton Man of the Year Award
"Whizzer" White NFL Man of the Year Award

External links
 NFF Distinguished American Award Recipients
 2007 Press Release

College football lifetime achievement awards
Awards established in 1966
1966 establishments in the United States